Kurya may refer to:
Kurya (khan), Pecheneg khan
Kurya people, an ethnic group living in Mwanza, Tanzania
Kurya (rural locality), several rural localities in Russia

es:Kuriá
pl:Kuria (wieś)
ru:Курья (Алтайский край)